Amazonotrema is a monotypic genus of lichenised fungi in the family Graphidaceae. It was circumscribed in 2009 by Klaus Kalb and Robert Lücking for the species Amazonotrema nigrum. The type specimen of A. nigrum was collected from virgin rainforest along the Rio Negro in the Brazilian state of Amazonas.

Taxonomy 
The genus name is a combination of Amazon, for the Amazon basin region from which the type specimen was collected, and trema, for the systematic position of the genus within the family Graphidaceae; it falls into the "thelotremoid" group because of the structure of its fruiting bodies. , it had not been genetically sequenced, so its relationship to other genera in the family is uncertain.

Description 
Amazonotrema nigrum is a crustose lichen with a smooth, grey, and somewhat glossy surface, and it grows on tree bark, stripped wood and tree fern stems. Its apothecia, which tend to be dispersed across the lichen's surface, are steep-sided, broadly rounded at the apex, and the same colour as the thallus. The apothecia's central disc is typically black, which is what led to the scientific name nigrum.

Each  within the apothecia contains 5–8 , which are chestnut-brown in colour and arranged in rows.

The lichen produces several secondary metabolites, including stictic acid and constictic acid.

References

Citations

Sources

External links 
 Photo of Amazonotrema nigrum on the Field Museum of Natural History (Chicago) website

Lichen genera
Graphidaceae
Taxa described in 2009
Taxa named by Klaus Kalb
Taxa named by Robert Lücking
Ostropales genera